U Gotta Feel Me is the second studio album (third overall) by American rapper Lil' Flip. The first single, "Game Over (Flip)", reached number 8 on the Hot R&B/Hip-Hop Songs charts and number 15 on the Billboard Hot 100. The follow-up single, "Sunshine" featuring newcomer Lea, went to number 2 on both the Billboard Hot 100 and Hot R&B/Hip-Hop Songs becoming Lil' Flip's biggest hit of his career.

The album debuted at number 4 on the US Billboard 200 chart with 198,000 copies sold in the first week released (on that same day of the official release of Usher's Confessions, which also peaked at #1 on the same charting week), becoming Lil' Flip's highest-charting album to date. The album was certified Platinum in August 2004. The album has sold over 1 million copies in the United States to date, also making it Lil' Flip's best selling album of his career.

Track listing

Disc 1

Disc 2

Chart performance

Weekly charts

Year-end charts

Singles

References

2004 albums
Lil' Flip albums
Albums produced by the Heatmakerz